Ronald William Serafini (October 31, 1953 – October 30, 2021) was an American professional ice hockey defenseman who played only two games in the National Hockey League for the California Golden Seals and 16 games for the Cincinnati Stingers of the World Hockey Association.

Serafini was born in Highland Park, Michigan, but grew up in Detroit, Michigan. As a youth, he played in the 1965 and 1966 Quebec International Pee-Wee Hockey Tournaments with the Detroit Roostertail minor ice hockey team.

After hockey career he worked as a Realtor in Clarkston, Michigan.

Regular season and playoffs

References

External links

Serafini's player profile at HockeyDraftCentral.com

1953 births
2021 deaths
American men's ice hockey defensemen
California Golden Seals draft picks
California Golden Seals players
Cincinnati Stingers players
Cleveland Crusaders draft picks
Denver Spurs players
Hampton Gulls (SHL) players
Ice hockey people from Detroit
Oklahoma City Blazers (1965–1977) players
People from Highland Park, Michigan
St. Catharines Black Hawks players
Salt Lake Golden Eagles (CHL) players
Salt Lake Golden Eagles (WHL) players
Tucson Mavericks players
Winston-Salem Polar Twins (SHL) players